Speedy Gonzales: Los Gatos Bandidos is a Super Nintendo Entertainment System video game that was released in 1995 in North America.

Summary 
In a small Mexican village, all the mice are enjoying a fiesta until Los Gatos Bandidos, a group of cats, come and kidnap them. Only Slowpoke Rodriguez escapes and sends for his cousin, Speedy Gonzales. Speedy enters each level and tries to rescue as many mice as possible while chasing after cheese and avoiding natural hazards. The gameplay in Speedy Gonzales resembles the Sonic the Hedgehog series.

Players can access a short-range kick for attacking and can occasionally pick up items for usage at a later time in the game. The game is full of bottomless pits and spikes, which kill players instantly. Getting locked up in a cage also causes players to lose a life. Arch-enemies from the cartoon show such as Sylvester and Robocat appear in the game. In Stage 6-1, there is a specific button in one section on the level that used to lock up emulators, due to improper emulation on how the game executed code for the button. Near, known for their emulator higan, documented on how this occurred and how it was fixed.

Reception 

Captain Squideo of GamePro gave the game a mostly mixed review, particularly focusing on the easy and rudimentary gameplay: "The game's colorful cartoon style is reminiscent of last year's Yogi Bear game, and the simplistic run-n-jump gameplay will appeal only to young gamers. ... The puzzles are remedial, enemies drop with one quick kick, and abundant time bonuses help you beat the clock." However, he did praise the quality and charm of the music, voices, and sound effects. A reviewer for Next Generation criticized that the gameplay mechanics and level designs are mostly shamelessly ripped off from the Sonic the Hedgehog series, and handles them poorly with choppy animation and "a momentum that makes you feel as though you're controlling a large walrus, rather than a mouse." He gave it one out of five stars.

References

1995 video games
Side-scrolling video games
North America-exclusive video games
Platform games
Acclaim Entertainment games
Super Nintendo Entertainment System games
Super Nintendo Entertainment System-only games
Video games featuring Sylvester the Cat
Video games about mice and rats
Video games set in Mexico
Video games developed in the United Kingdom
Cartoon Network video games
Single-player video games